The Journal of Comparative Physiology B: Biochemical, Systemic, and Environmental Physiology is a monthly peer-reviewed scientific journal of comparative physiology. It was established in 1984, when it was split off from the Journal of Comparative Physiology. The editor-in-chief is Gerhard Heldmaier (Universität Marburg). The journal become electronic only in 2017.

Abstracting and indexing
The journal is indexed and abstracted in the following bibliographic databases:

According to the Journal Citation Reports, the journal has a 2017 impact factor of 2.517.

References

External links

Physiology journals
Publications established in 1984
Monthly journals
English-language journals
Springer Science+Business Media academic journals